Texmelucan may refer to:

San Martín Texmelucan, Puebla
San Martín Texmelucan (municipality), Puebla
San Lorenzo Texmelucan, Oaxaca
Texmelucan Zapotec language